Flash Harry is the fifteenth studio album by Harry Nilsson. Originally the album was not given a worldwide release and was only issued in the U.K., Japan, Germany, France, Spain, The Netherlands, Australia, and Scandinavia. It was not issued in the United States until August 2013. Upon release it received little promotion from Mercury, with no proper single from the album.

The album features Nilsson's own recording of "Old Dirt Road", co-written and performed with John Lennon on Lennon's album Walls and Bridges (1974), Lennon's last album of original songs before his six-year hiatus.

Shortly after the release of this album, Nilsson retired from recording.  Though he would subsequently reverse his decision and record various songs for film soundtracks in the 1980s and 1990s, he never issued another full album. (Hours before his 1994 death, Nilsson finished recording the final vocal tracks for a planned 'comeback' album, which was released on November 22, 2019 as Losst and Founnd.)

Track listing
"Harry" (Eric Idle) – 2:22 (this track produced by Eric Idle, Trevor Jones, and Andre Jacquemin and sung by Eric Idle and Charlie Dore)
"Cheek to Cheek" (Lowell George, Van Dyke Parks, Martin Fydor Kibbee) – 2:30
"Best Move" (Nilsson, Parks, Michael Hazlewood) – 4:04
"Old Dirt Road" (Nilsson, John Lennon) – 4:26
"I Don't Need You" (Rick L. Christian) – 3:49
"Rain" (Nilsson) – 3:51
"I've Got It!" (Nilsson, Perry Botkin, Jr.) – 3:42
"It's So Easy" (Nilsson, Paul Stallworth) – 4:43
"How Long Can Disco On" (Nilsson, Ringo Starr) – 2:54
"Bright Side of Life" (Idle) – 4:12

2013 CD reissue bonus tracks
"Old Dirt Road" (Harry Nilsson, John Lennon) - 4:04 (Alternate version)
"Feet" (Danny Kortchmar) - 2:34 (Previously Unreleased)
"Leave The Rest to Molly" (Allen Toussaint) - 5:14 (Previously Unreleased)
"She Drifted Away" (John Lawrence Agostino) - 3:32 (Previously Unreleased)

Personnel
Ben Benay, Danny Kortchmar, Fred Tackett, Keith Allison, Lowell George – guitar
Donald Dunn, Klaus Voormann, Paul Stallworth, Scott Edwards – bass guitar
Bill Payne, John Barlow Jarvis, Van Dyke Parks – keyboards
Dr. John – piano
Fred Staehle, Jim Keltner, Rick Shlosser, Ringo Starr – drums
Arthur Gerst – harp
Bobby Keys, Jerome Jumonville, Jimmy Roberts, Wilton Felder – saxophone

Recorded at Cherokee Studios in Los Angeles, California, US.

References

Harry Nilsson albums
1980 albums
Albums produced by Steve Cropper
Mercury Records albums